The Men's Downhill in the 2018 FIS Alpine Skiing World Cup involved nine events, including the season finale in Åre, Sweden. Swiss skier Beat Feuz ended the two-season reign of Italy's Peter Fill and won the season title in this discipline after a season-long battle with former discipline champion Aksel Lund Svindal of Norway. 

The season was interrupted by the 2018 Winter Olympics from 12-24 February 2018 at Yongpyong Alpine Centre (slalom and giant slalom) at the Alpensia Sports Park in PyeongChang and at the Jeongseon Alpine Centre (speed events) in Jeongseon, South Korea.  The men's downhill was scheduled to be held on 11 February, but high winds forced its postponement until 15 February.

Standings

DNF = Did Not Finish
DNS = Did Not Start

See also
 2018 Alpine Skiing World Cup – Men's summary rankings
 2018 Alpine Skiing World Cup – Men's Overall
 2018 Alpine Skiing World Cup – Men's Super-G
 2018 Alpine Skiing World Cup – Men's Giant Slalom
 2018 Alpine Skiing World Cup – Men's Slalom
 2018 Alpine Skiing World Cup – Men's Combined
 World Cup scoring system

References

External links
 Alpine Skiing at FIS website

External links
 

Men's Downhill
FIS Alpine Ski World Cup men's downhill discipline titles